Hypolycaena pachalica, the eastern hairstreak, is a butterfly in the family Lycaenidae. It was described by Arthur Gardiner Butler in 1888. It is found in Uganda, eastern and northern Kenya, the Democratic Republic of the Congo (Ituri, Mahagi-Port, Kivu and Semliki), Tanzania, Malawi, Zambia, south-western Saudi Arabia and Yemen. The habitat consists of savanna and open forests.

Adults are attracted to flowers and males occasionally come to damp patches.

The larvae feed on Combretum constrictum and Talinum portulacifolium.

References

External links
Die Gross-Schmetterlinge der Erde 13: Die Afrikanischen Tagfalter. Plate XIII 67 a, b

Butterflies described in 1888
Hypolycaenini
Butterflies of Africa
Taxa named by Arthur Gardiner Butler